Rodrigo Javier Salinas (born 4 July 1986) is an Argentine professional footballer who plays as a forward for Primera División Peruana side Atlético Grau.

Career
Salinas began his senior career in 2004 with Villa San Carlos, he remained with the Primera C club until 2009 and scored a total of thirteen goals in ninety-three matches. Godoy Cruz of the Argentine Primera División signed Salinas in 2009, he scored three goals in his first season including a hat-trick in a 6–2 win over Tigre on 12 April 2010. Overall, he stayed with the club for six seasons and scored nine goals in fifty-four appearances. Whilst with Godoy Cruz, Salinas was loaned out twice to Rosario Central and Unión Santa Fe respectively. He failed to score for Rosario Central but did score eight times for Unión Santa Fe.

In August 2014, Salinas left Argentine football to join Ascenso MX team Atlante. He departed almost a year later following two goals in ten games. He returned to Argentina and subsequently had a two-season spell with Los Andes in Primera B Nacional, prior to signing for fellow second tier club Chacarita Juniors. He went onto score thirty goals in forty-three matches as Chacarita won promotion to the Argentine Primera División. On 17 August 2017, Salinas joined Saudi Professional League side Al-Ettifaq. He scored on his debut in a loss to Al-Qadisiyah on 14 September. One more goal and six more appearances followed.

Salinas mutually terminated his contract with Al-Ettifaq in January 2018, he subsequently agreed to sign for Argentine Primera División team Vélez Sarsfield.

Career statistics
.

References

External links

1986 births
Living people
Footballers from La Plata
Argentine footballers
Association football forwards
Argentine expatriate footballers
Expatriate footballers in Mexico
Expatriate footballers in Saudi Arabia
Argentine expatriate sportspeople in Mexico
Argentine expatriate sportspeople in Saudi Arabia
Primera C Metropolitana players
Argentine Primera División players
Primera Nacional players
Ascenso MX players
Saudi Professional League players
Club Atlético Villa San Carlos footballers
Godoy Cruz Antonio Tomba footballers
Rosario Central footballers
Unión de Santa Fe footballers
Atlante F.C. footballers
Club Atlético Los Andes footballers
Chacarita Juniors footballers
Ettifaq FC players
Club Atlético Vélez Sarsfield footballers
Newell's Old Boys footballers